Urubamba Province is one of thirteen provinces in the Cusco Region in the southern highlands of Peru.

Geography 
The province is bounded to the north by the La Convención Province, to the east by the Calca Province, to the south by the Cusco Province and the Anta Province, and to the west by the La Convención Province.

The Urupampa and Willkapampa mountain ranges traverse the province. Some of the highest peaks of the province are listed below:

Political division
The province is divided into seven districts (singular: distrito), each of which is headed by a mayor (alcalde). The districts, with their capitals in parenthesis, are:

 Chinchero (Chinchero)
 Huayllabamba (Huayllabamba)
 Machupicchu (Machupicchu)
 Maras (Maras)
 Ollantaytambo (Ollantaytambo)
 Urubamba (Urubamba)
 Yucay (Yucay)

Ethnic groups 
The people in the province are mainly indigenous citizens of Quechua descent. Quechua is the language which the majority of the population (51.34%) learnt to speak in childhood, 46.78% of the residents started speaking using the Spanish language (2007 Peru Census).

Archaeological sites 
The UNESCO World Heritage Site of Machu Pikchu is probably the most famous site among the numerous archaeological remains of the province. Other places are listed below:

 Ayawayq'u
 Inkapintay
 Khichuqaqa
 Machu Q'inti
 Machu Qullqa
 Pumamarka
 Qurimarka
 Wayna Q'inti

See also 
 Kachi Qhata
 Kusichaka River
 Pakaymayu
 Qusqu Qhawarina
 Q'illuqucha
 Warmi Wañusqa
 Yanaqucha

Images

Sources 

Provinces of the Cusco Region